The following lists the top 25 albums of 2018 in Australia from the Australian Recording Industry Association (ARIA) end-of-year albums chart.

The Greatest Showman soundtrack was the most popular album in Australia in 2018. The album spent 49 weeks inside the top 10 and it is the first soundtrack to top the End of Year Charts since Moulin Rouge! in 2001. Ed Sheeran's ÷ was number 1 in 2017. Amy Shark's Love Monster was the highest selling album by an Australian artist in 2018.

Top 25  

Notes

See also  
 List of number-one albums of 2018 (Australia) 
 List of top 10 albums in 2018 (Australia) 
 List of Top 25 singles for 2018 in Australia 
 2018 in music 
 ARIA Charts 
 List of Australian chart achievements and milestones

References 

 

Australian record charts
2018 in Australian music
Australia Top 25 Albums